Postles House, also known as "The Gargoyle House", is a historic home located at Wilmington, New Castle County, Delaware. It was built in 1905, and is a three-story, "T"-shaped stone dwelling with eclectic Tudor Gothic style elements. It features two-story polygonal bays topped with battlements, steep parapeted gables, decorative wrought iron work, and a slate roof.  Also on the property are a contributing carriage house.

It was added to the National Register of Historic Places in 1982.

References

Houses on the National Register of Historic Places in Delaware
Tudor Revival architecture in Delaware
Houses completed in 1905
Houses in Wilmington, Delaware
National Register of Historic Places in Wilmington, Delaware
1905 establishments in Delaware